Volodymyr Melnykov (born September 14, 1951, Chernivtsi) is a Ukrainian poet, writer, songwriter, composer and public figure, Merited Figure of Arts of Ukraine.

Biography 
Volodymyr Melnykov was born on September 14, 1951 in the city of Chernivtsi.

In 1974 – graduated from Minsk Higher Air Defense Anti-aircraft Missile Academy (Faculty of Radio Engineering).

In 1982 – graduated with honors (gold medal) from Kiev Military Academy of Air Defense of the Land Forces (Faculty of Engineering Management).
 
In 1987 – graduated from Kiev Military Academy of Air Defense of the Land Forces (he graduated from the postgraduate course and defended the dissertation of the candidate of technical sciences).
 
In 1969–1991 – served in the Armed Forces of the USSR (Moscow Air Defense District; Northern Group of Forces, Legnica, Poland; Turkestan Military District, Mary). In 1991 he was awarded the military rank "Colonel" and the scientific title "Associate Professor". Before the collapse of the USSR, he was a senior lecturer of the Kiev Military Air Defense Academy of the Land Forces.

In 1992–1995 – served in the Verification Center of the General Staff of the Armed Forces of Ukraine.

In 1995–2001, served in the General Military Inspectorate under the President of Ukraine, where before the liquidation of the Inspectorate he was the head of the inspection department for international military cooperation and compliance with international treaties on disarmament and arms control.
 
In late 2001, he retired from military service. Immediately continued his service in the Presidential Administration of Ukraine, where he served as deputy head of the department in the Main Directorate of Judicial Reform, military formations and law enforcement bodies.

In 2003 he was transferred to the State Administration of Affairs of the President of Ukraine, where he served until 2005 as the head of the Department for Economic Development.

In 2017 he worked in the office of the Writer's Union of Ukraine.

His artistic awards 
 The winner of the Art Prize of the State Border Guard Service of Ukraine "Emerald Lyra" for the first place in the nomination "Music" (2004)
 Laureate of the festival of the National Radio of Ukraine for the words to the song "I'm in love with Ukraine" (2013)
 Winner of the open nationwide song contest "My Dear Mother" (2014)
 Diploma for creating a cycle of patriotic songs at the All-Ukrainian Song Contest "Premiere of the Song" (2015)

His books 
 Druziam. Moim Tovarisham. To my friends (2003) 
Ukraintsi Ne Papuasy (2007)
 Bezmezna Dolia  (2014)

Awards 
 Polish Bronze Medal on the Watch of Peace (1979)
 Medal For military service to Ukraine (2000) 
 Merited Figure of Arts of Ukraine (2004)

Social activity 
 Responsible Secretary of the Supervisory Board of the National Presidential Orchestra of Ukraine
 Deputy Chairman of the public organization of the Association of Bukovynes in the city of Kyiv "Bukovina"

References

External links 
 Encyclopedia of modern Ukraine about Volodymyr Melnykov, v.20. p.p. 135-136 
 Почесні імена України – еліта держави, том IV, видавництво «ЛОГОС УКРАЇНА», 2017, p.203
 V.Melnikov Books in the National Library of Vernadsky
 About the author Volodymyr Melnykov in the electronic library Rulit
 Department of Education and Science of the Chernivtsi Regional State Administration about Volodymyr Melnykov

1951 births
Living people
Ukrainian male poets
Ukrainian composers
Musicians from Chernivtsi
Ukrainian songwriters
Writers from Chernivtsi
Recipients of the Honorary Diploma of the Cabinet of Ministers of Ukraine